Everything Is Copy — Nora Ephron: Scripted & Unscripted is an American documentary film that premiered on March 21, 2016 on HBO. Directed and written by Jacob Bernstein and Nick Hooker, the film explores the life and legacy of legendary writer and film director Nora Ephron.

Premise
Everything Is Copy — Nora Ephron: Scripted & Unscripted follows Ephron's career "from her gig as the “mail girl” at Newsweek to reporting for the New York Post to becoming a prestigious essayist at Esquire to successfully writing and directing Hollywood movies that revitalized the romantic comedy genre. The film captures Ephron's "razor-sharp wit while at the same time presenting her flaws through interviews with her closest friends like Meg Ryan, Meryl Streep, Tom Hanks, Steven Spielberg, the late Mike Nichols and journalists like Gay Talese and Richard Cohen."

Persons featured
The documentary features interviews with Meg Ryan, Meryl Streep, Tom Hanks, Steven Spielberg, Mike Nichols, Gay Talese, and Richard Cohen.

Release

Marketing
On March 6, 2016, HBO released the first trailer for the film.

Premiere
On September 29, 2015, the film held its official premiere during the annual New York Film Festival.

Reception

Critical response
Everything Is Copy has been met with a positive response from critics. On the review aggregation website Rotten Tomatoes, the film holds a 100% approval rating with an average rating of 8.5 out of 10, based on 14 reviews. Metacritic, which uses a weighted average, assigned the season a score of 88 out of 100 based on 6 critics, indicating "universal acclaim".

Awards and nominations

See also
List of HBO Films films

References

External links
Everything Is Copy on HBO

2015 films
HBO documentary films
2010s English-language films
2010s American films